Neil Anant Karnik (born 14 October 2004) is a Singaporean cricketer who plays for the Singapore cricket team. In June 2022, he was named in Singapore's Twenty20 International (T20I) squad for the 2022 Singa Championship Series. He made his T20I debut on 3 July 2022, for Singapore against Papua New Guinea. The following month, he was named in Singapore's squad for the 2022 ICC Men's T20 World Cup Global Qualifier B tournament.

References

External links
 

2004 births
Living people
Singaporean cricketers
Singapore Twenty20 International cricketers
Singaporean sportspeople of Indian descent